Boteka Airport  is an airport serving Boteka, Democratic Republic of the Congo.

References

Airports in the Province of Équateur